46 Squadron or 46th Squadron may refer to:

 No. 46 Squadron (Finland), a unit of the Finnish Air Force 
 No. 46 Squadron RAF, a unit of the United Kingdom Royal Air Force
 Attack Squadron 46 (United States Navy), a unit of the United States Navy

See also
 46th Division (disambiguation)
 46th Brigade (disambiguation)
 46th Regiment (disambiguation)